125 High Street is a 30-floor postmodern highrise in the Financial District  of Boston, Massachusetts.  Standing 452 feet (138 m) tall, the highrise is currently the 23rd-tallest building in the city. 125 High Street has approximately 1.8 million square feet (167,000 square meters) of Class A office space. It was designed by Jung Brannen Associates and is owned and operated by Tishman Speyer.

History
NYNEX (now Verizon and formerly Bell Atlantic), one of Massachusetts' largest employers, wished to consolidate into a single headquarters facility.  It was formerly the site of the Traveler's Insurance Building. The existing 16-story, 300,000 square foot (28,000 square meter) structure was demolished in 1988 to make room for 125 High Street.

Design and features

Architecture and layout
The complex consists of four buildings. 
 125 High St is a 30-story, 950,000 square foot (88,000 square meter) office tower. This building is the tallest component of a development.
 145 High St is 21-story, 500,000 square foot (46,000 square meter) office tower. It sometimes also known as the Oliver Street Tower.
  Along with the two towers it also includes three restored 19th century buildings with six, five and four stories, totaling 41,600 square feet (3,900 square meters).
 The fire station makes the office towers one of the few highrises with an on-premises municipal fire company.
The property also includes a five-level, 850-car underground parking garage.

The exterior is of a unifying granite, with entrances to the building through the High Street Tower and Oliver Street Tower.  The two towers are connected via a central 8-story atrium with skylights 150 feet (46 m) above the floor.

Design and construction team
Architect: Jung Brannen Associates
Structural Engineer: LeMessurier Consultants
MEP/FP Engineer: Cosentini Associates, Inc.
Developer: Spaulding & Slye (now known as Jones Lang LaSalle)
Construction Managers: Spaulding & Slye (now known as Jones Lang LaSalle)
General Contractor: HCB Conctractors (now known as The Beck Group)
Art Installation: "The Light Between", Anne Patterson's art installation, is on display indefinitely in the ten-story atrium of 125 High Street. It consists of seven miles of multi-colored aluminum ribbon. The nearly 450 110' strands transport the light from the glass ceiling above to the viewers below.

Gallery

See also

 List of tallest buildings in Boston

References

External links

 Official website
 125 High Street at Tishman Speyer
 
 
 

Office buildings completed in 1991
Skyscraper office buildings in Boston
Jung Brannen buildings
1991 establishments in Massachusetts